The EAR 30 class was a class of oil-burning  gauge  steam locomotives. The class was built in 1955 by North British Locomotive Company in Glasgow, Scotland, for the East African Railways (EAR).  Its design was derived from the  EAR 29 class, which, in turn, was based upon the Nigerian Railways River class.

The 26 members of the class served their entire careers in Tanganyika/Tanzania, one of the three territories/countries served by the EAR.

Class list
The numbers and names of each member of the class were as follows:

See also
History of rail transport in Tanzania

References

Notes

Bibliography

External links

East African Railways locomotives
Metre gauge steam locomotives
NBL locomotives
Railway locomotives introduced in 1955
Steam locomotives of Tanzania
2-8-4 locomotives
1′D2′ h2 locomotives